The 2015 Andy Murray tennis season began at the Australian Open. Murray was the defending champion at the Shenzhen, Vienna and Valencia Opens, but chose not to defend these titles. His season saw him reach seven singles finals, winning titles at Munich, Madrid, Queen's and Montreal, while he won eight singles and three doubles rubbers to help lead Great Britain to the Davis Cup title for the first time in 79 years.

Year in Detail

Australian Open Series and early hard-court season

Hopman Cup
At the beginning of the year Murray teamed up with Heather Watson in the Hopman Cup, where in the group stage they having won fewer sets and games than Poland, finishing second in their group. Murray and Watson lost the doubles match against Poland, however Murray went undefeated in singles, beating Benoît Paire, Jerzy Janowicz and Marinko Matosevic, each in straight sets.

Australian Open

Murray entered the first Grand Slam event of the year as the 6th seed, and began strongly as he defeated qualifier Yuki Bhambri, Australian Marinko Matosevic and João Sousa of Portugal without dropping a set. He followed this up by defeating 10th seed Grigor Dimitrov in four tightly contested sets, despite his opponent having served for the fourth set at 5–3; Murray won the last five games to seal the win, and make it through to the quarterfinals in Melbourne for the sixth straight year. In the quarterfinals, the Scot faced teenage sensation and home favourite Nick Kyrgios, in the Australian's second Grand slam quarterfinal in as many appearances. Murray made light work of his young opponent, and despite being broken towards the end of the third set, Murray made it through in straight sets to his 15th Grand Slam semifinal. He faced Tomáš Berdych for the first time since 2013, going into the match with a 4–6 disadvantage in their head-to-head. Despite losing the first set, Murray then dominated proceedings, taking the second set to love and ultimately winning in four sets to make it through to his fourth final at the Australian Open, his eighth career Grand Slam final appearance. Here he faced Novak Djokovic for his first Australian open title. However, he lost in four sets, which would be his fifth consecutive defeat to the Serb.

Rotterdam Open
Murray entered the Rotterdam Open as the first seed and won both his opening matches in straight sets against Nicolas Mahut and Vasek Pospisil. However, he lost at the quarterfinal stage in straight sets to Gilles Simon, who ended a 12 match losing streak to Murray.

Dubai Tennis Championships
Murray won his opening match in straight sets against Gilles Müller, then thrashed João Sousa for the loss of just two games to reach the quarterfinals. However, he got thrashed in the quarterfinal stage to Croatian teenager Borna Ćorić, winning just four games.

Davis Cup World Group First Round
Murray next played in the Davis Cup World Group First Round in Glasgow. He won his first match in four sets against Donald Young and then defeated John Isner in straight sets, despite Isner having set points in the first set. Those two victories, along with a five set marathon win by James Ward over Isner, allowed Great Britain to progress to the quarterfinals for the second consecutive time with a 3–2 lead over the United States.

Indian Wells
Murray beat Vasek Pospisil in straight sets, then defeated Philipp Kohlschreiber in three sets. He then won his next two matches in straight sets against Adrian Mannarino and Feliciano López (overtaking Tim Henman's record of 496 career wins to have the most career wins in the Open Era for a British man) but lost in the semifinal stage to Djokovic in straight sets.

Murray also participated in the doubles alongside Thanasi Kokkinakis and they both won their opening match against the fourth seeds Jean-Julien Rojer and Horia Tecău but lost their next match against Marcin Matkowski and Nenad Zimonjić.

Miami Open
Murray again faced Donald Young in his opening match and defeated him in straight sets before beating Santiago Giraldo in straight sets to avenge his defeat in the 2014 Madrid Open. He then defeated Kevin Anderson in three sets to record his 500th career win in the ATP World Tour, becoming the first British man in the Open Era to do so. He then reached the final after defeating Dominic Thiem in three sets and Tomáš Berdych in straight sets. He then lost the final to Djokovic in three sets (who won a record fifth Miami title) and was again broken to love in the third and deciding set, having received a bagel during his defeat to Djokovic in the Australian Open final.

Spring Clay Court season and French Open

Bavarian International Tennis Championships
Murray did not participate in the Monte-Carlo Masters due to his marriage to his longtime girlfriend Kim Sears, so he began his Clay Court season in the Bavarian International Tennis Championships at Munich. He defeated Mischa Zverev in straight sets and then reached his first ever Clay Court final after defeating Lukáš Rosol in three sets and Roberto Bautista Agut in straight sets, completing both matches in a single day after his match with Rosol was suspended by rain in the previous day. He then won his first title on Clay by defeating Philipp Kohlschreiber in three sets, requiring tiebreakers to win both the first and third sets. This made him the first British player to win a tour level Clay Court title since Buster Mottram in 1976.

Murray paired up with Jean-Julien Rojer in the doubles and they both upset the third seeds Lukáš Rosol and Raven Klaasen and then beat Rameez Junaid and Adil Shamasdin to reach the semifinals where they lost to the top seeds Alexander Peya and Bruno Soares, in what was Murray's third match of the day after his singles victories over Rosol and Bautista Agut.

Madrid Open
He then took his newfound form on Clay to the Madrid Open, beating Kohlschreiber again in three sets in his opening match after breaking to love in the third set during an early morning match finishing at 3:00am. He then thrashed Marcel Granollers in straight sets, losing only two games, and then beat Milos Raonic (who was struggling with a foot injury) and Kei Nishikori both in straight sets to face Rafael Nadal in the final. He won his second straight Clay court title and his first Masters 1000 title on Clay by defeating Nadal in straight sets, his first victory over Nadal since the 2011 Japan Open and his first victory against Nadal on Clay after six previous defeats. By winning, he became only the fourth player to defeat Nadal in a clay court final, following Roger Federer, Djokovic and Horacio Zeballos.

Rome Masters
Murray beat Jérémy Chardy in straight sets but withdrew due to fatigue from the tournament before his next match against David Goffin, after playing nine matches in the space of ten days and his early morning match against Kohlschreiber in the Madrid Open.

French Open
Murray then entered the French Open with a 10 match winning streak on Clay, extending that streak by beating Facundo Argüello in straight sets and João Sousa in four sets in his opening round matches. He next defeated Nick Kyrgios again in straight sets and then beat Jerémy Chardy and David Ferrer both in four sets to reach his third semifinal in the French Open. He faced Djokovic again and lost the first two sets, but won the next two sets to take the match into a deciding set during a two-day match delayed by a thunderstorm. However, he ultimately lost the match in five sets, putting an end to his 15 match winning streak on Clay.

Grass Court season and Wimbledon

Queens Club Championships
Murray began his grass court season at Queen's Club. He won his first two matches in straight sets against Lu Yen-hsun and Fernando Verdasco before defeating Gilles Müller in three sets to reach the semifinals. Murray went on to win his 34th career title by defeating Victor Troicki and Kevin Anderson in straight sets both in a single day after his match with Troicki was suspended by rain. This was his fourth Queen's Club title, equalling the number of titles which John McEnroe, Boris Becker, Lleyton Hewitt and Andy Roddick had won in the Open Era.

In the doubles, Murray paired up with Dominic Inglot but they both lost in the first round to Alexander Peya and Bruno Soares.

Wimbledon Championships
Murray drew Kazakh Mikhail Kukushkin in the opening round of the Wimbledon Championships. He won in straight sets, and also defeated Robin Haase in straight sets to reach the third round, where he played Andreas Seppi. Murray went two sets up but then lost six games in a row after Seppi had taken an injury timeout, before Murray had shoulder treatment and came back to win the final six games and the match.

Murray reached the quarter-finals after a four-set victory over Ivo Karlović, and there beat Vasek Pospisil in straight sets to reach his sixth Wimbledon semi-final and set up a match against Roger Federer. However, after missing a break point opportunity against the Federer serve in the first game, Federer never faced another break point and managed to break Murray at the end of each set to win 7–5, 7–5, 6–4.

Davis Cup World Group Quarterfinals
With the Davis Cup Quarterfinals taking place at the Queen's Club, Murray won his first match against Jo-Wilfried Tsonga in straight sets. He then paired up with his elder brother and doubles specialist Jamie Murray in the doubles against Tsonga and Nicolas Mahut and despite losing the first set along with Murray sustaining a fall during the match, the two brothers eventually won the match in four sets. He then faced Gilles Simon in his next singles match and after initially being a set and a break down, he suddenly found his form again towards the end of the second set and eventually won in four sets, winning 12 of the last 15 games in the process (with Simon struggling from an ankle injury). With a 3–1 lead over France, this resulted in Great Britain reaching their first Davis Cup semifinal since 1981.

US Open Series

Washington Open
Murray was the top seed in the tournament and drew Teymuraz Gabashvili in the second round. Both players split the first two sets with Gabashvili winning the first set and Murray winning the second set. However, despite serving for the match at 5–4 in the third set, Murray was broken back and lost the match in three sets after a deciding tiebreaker. Murray also paired up with Daniel Nester in the doubles but they lost in the first round to the third seeds Rohan Bopanna and Florin Mergea in three sets.

Canadian Open
Murray responded well from his shock defeat in the Washington Open by defeating Tommy Robredo in straight sets despite Robredo being a break up in the second set. This was then followed by straight sets victories over Gilles Müller in the third round and the defending champion Jo-Wilfried Tsonga (who had defeated Murray in the same stage the previous year en route to claiming the title) in the quarterfinals. He then faced Kei Nishikori again in the semifinals but despite the first set having three breaks in a row, Murray won the second set comfortably with a bagel, winning 12 of the last 13 points in the process, advancing to the final without dropping a set. This therefore ensured that he would overtake Roger Federer as the world number 2, returning to that ranking for the first time since 2013. He faced Djokovic again and both players split the opening two sets after three breaks of serve in each set, with Murray winning the first set and Djokovic taking the second set. Murray then broke for an early lead in the third set and despite saving 6 break points along with Djokovic saving 5 match points, Murray won the match in three sets, ending an eight-match losing streak against the world number 1. This was Murray's first victory over Djokovic since his Wimbledon victory in 2013, and the first time he had defeated Djokovic in the deciding set of a three-set match.

In the doubles, Murray paired up with 16-time doubles Grand Slam champion Leander Paes, and they beat Kevin Anderson and Jérémy Chardy in straight sets to set up a meeting with John Peers and Murray's elder brother Jamie Murray, marking the first time the two brothers had faced against each other in a professional match. However, despite having set points in the second-set tiebreaker, the elder Murray and Peers won the match in straight sets.

Cincinnati Masters
In the second Master Series tournament of the US Hard Court season, Murray defeated Mardy Fish in the second round, and then beat both Grigor Dimitrov and Richard Gasquet in three-set matches, having to come from a set down on both occasions, while Dimitrov had served for the match in the deciding set. In the semi-final he lost to defending champion Roger Federer in straight sets, and after Federer went on to win the tournament this result saw Murray drop back to number 3 in the rankings.

US Open
Murray drew Nick Kyrgios in the first round and while he won the first two sets, Kyrgios won the third set, his first against Murray having lost their last three meetings in straight sets, before losing in four sets. Murray then faced Adrian Mannarino in the second round and unexpectedly dropped the first two sets before finding his form and winning the next three sets to prevail in five sets, matching Roger Federer for winning 8 matches from 2 sets down. Murray then beat Thomaz Bellucci in straight sets, dropping his serve only once in the match, to face Kevin Anderson in the fourth round. However, while Murray easily won their last meeting in the Queens Club final, Anderson's serve this time proved too much for Murray as he took the first set in a tiebreaker and then broke Murray in the second set for a two set to love lead. While Murray battled back to take the third set in a tiebreaker, Anderson won the match in four sets to reach his first Grand Slam quarterfinal without dropping a point in the last tiebreaker. This ended Murray's five-year run of 18 consecutive Grand Slam Quarterfinals (not counting his withdrawal from the 2013 French Open) since his third round loss to Stan Wawrinka in the 2010 US Open.

Davis Cup and End of Season

Davis Cup World Group Semifinals
Playing against Australia in the semifinals of the Davis Cup World Group in Glasgow, Andy Murray won both his singles rubbers in straight sets, against Thanasi Kokkinakis and Bernard Tomic.	
He also partnered his brother Jamie, and they won in five sets against the pairing of Sam Groth and Lleyton Hewitt, the results guiding Great Britain to the Davis Cup final for the first time since 1978.

Shanghai Masters
Andy Murray reached the semifinals after victories against Steve Johnson and John Isner, before defeating Tomáš Berdych in straight sets including a run of nine games in a row. In the semifinals he lost to Novak Djokovic for the fifth time in the season, but the result along with Federer's early exit from the tournament ensured that Murray returned to the No. 2 ranking.

Paris Masters
Murray reached the quarter-finals for the loss of just four games, with victories against Borna Ćorić and David Goffin, before defeating Richard Gasquet in three sets to reach his first semi-final at the Paris Masters, becoming only the fourth person to reach the semi-finals or better at least once at all nine Masters tournaments. He then beat David Ferrer in straight sets, including a run of the last five games, but lost to Novak Djokovic in the final for the sixth time in the season.

ATP World Tour Finals
Murray had qualified for the Tour Finals and was seeded second, drawn in the same group as Stanislas Wawrinka, Rafael Nadal and David Ferrer. He beat Ferrer in his opening match, but lost both his other matches and was eliminated from the tournament at the group stage. However, Roger Federer lost in the final, ensuring that Murray finished the year as World No. 2 for the first time in his career.

Davis Cup World Group Final
After Kyle Edmund had lost the first singles rubber, Murray's victory over Ruben Bemelmans in straight sets pulled Great Britain level in the final, played on indoor clay courts at Ghent. He then partnered his brother Jamie in a four-set victory over the pairing of Steve Darcis and David Goffin, before defeating Goffin again in the reverse singles on Sunday, thus ensuring a 3-1 victory for Great Britain, their first Davis Cup title since 1936. Murray also became only the third person since the current Davis Cup format was introduced to win all eight of his singles rubbers in a Davis Cup season, after John McEnroe and Mats Wilander.

All matches

Singles matches

Doubles matches

Exhibitions

Tournament schedule

Singles schedule
Murray's 2015 singles tournament schedule was as follows:

Doubles schedule

Yearly records

Head-to-head matchups
Ordered by number of wins
(Bold denotes a top 10 player at the time of the most recent match between the two players, Italic denotes top 50; for players whose ranking changed over the course of the year, see the note for a more complete breakdown by ranking.)

Finals

Singles: 7 (4–3)

Team Competitions: 1 (Winner)

Earnings
Bold denotes tournament win.
	
 Figures in United States dollars (USD) unless noted.

See also

 2015 ATP World Tour
 2015 Novak Djokovic tennis season
 2015 Rafael Nadal tennis season
 2015 Roger Federer tennis season
 2015 Stan Wawrinka tennis season

Notes

References

External links
 
2015 Schedule at ATP Tour
2015 Schedule at Official Site 

Andy Murray tennis seasons
Murray tennis season
2015 in British sport